A pub game is one which is traditionally played inside or outside a pub or bar. Most pub games date back many years and are rooted in village culture. Many derive from older outdoor sports.

Pub games can be loosely grouped into throwing games, dice games, card games, board games, slot games, cue and ball games, bat and ball games,  coin pushing/throwing games, and drinking games.

History
In his book, Beer and Skittles, Richard Boston claims that the first regulation concerning national control of pubs was about pub games; Henry VII's statute of 1495 restricted the playing of "indoor games which were distracting Tudor pubmen from archery".

Many of pub games owe their origins to older outdoor sports, adapted and transformed over time for indoor play, either for convenience, or to allow publicans to maintain their teams during the off-season.

Gaming activities associated with pubs included card games such as cribbage, throwing games such as darts, physical sports such as cricket, and blood sports such as cock fighting. Balls Pond Road in Highbury, London, was named after an establishment run by Mr Ball that had a pond out the back filled with ducks, where drinkers could, for a certain fee, go out and take their chance at shooting the creatures.

Notable pub games

Pub games can be loosely grouped into throwing games, dice games, card games, board games, cue and ball games, bat and ball games, slot games, coin pushing/throwing games, and drinking games.

Throwing games

Darts

A game which involves the throwing of small missiles at a circular target, called a dartboard. It is one of the few traditional pub games that remains popular to the present day and is played in many countries. When played at a professional level the game adheres to a specific board design and set of rules, but as a pub game it can encompasses several variants, such as 'Cricket'.

Aunt Sally

Traditionally played in pubs and fairgrounds. An Aunt Sally was originally a figurine head of an old woman with a clay pipe in her mouth, or subsequently a ball on a stick. The object was for players to throw sticks at the head in order to break the pipe. The game bears some resemblance to a coconut shy, or skittles.

Today, the game of Aunt Sally is still played as a pub game in Oxfordshire. The ball is on a short plinth about 4 inches (10 cm) high, and is known as a 'dolly'. The dolly is placed on a dog-legged metal spike and players throw sticks or short battens at the dolly, trying to knock it off without hitting the spike.

Devil among the tailors

A form of table skittles. The game involves 9 small skittles arranged in a 3 x 3 square, usually within a shallow open-topped wooden box sitting on a table-top. The wooden ball (about the size of a golf ball) hangs from a string or chain attached to the top of a vertical wooden post rising from one corner of the box. The aim of the game is to knock down the skittles by swinging the ball in an arc round the post (rather than aiming directly at the skittles).

In the picturesque name, the 'devil' refers to the ball and the 'tailors' are the skittles.

Ringing the bull

A game which involves swinging a bull's nose-ring, which is attached to a string, in an arc so as to hook it onto a bull's horn or hook attached to the wall. It was adopted by the earlier settlers of the Caribbean islands, where it is also referred to as the Bimini Ring Game.

The game is still played in Ye Olde Trip To Jerusalem, in Nottingham, which claims to be Britain's oldest pub.

Quoits

A game which involves the throwing of metal, rope or rubber rings over a set distance, usually to land over or near a spike. The sport encompasses several distinct variations which are played either indoors on a small elevated table, or outside on a marked strip.

Dice games

Bar dice is a simple game played with five dice and a cup, often played to determine who buys the next round of drinks.

Card games

Numerous card games have been traditionally played in pubs. Those still popular to the present day includes:
Poker
Rummy
500 Rum
Bing rummy
Gin rummy
Cribbage
Euchre
Bid euchre
Blackjack
Hearts
Cancellation Hearts
Black Lady (U.S. only)
Black Maria (U.K. only)

Cue and ball games

Pool

Pool is played on a billiard table with six pockets into which balls are deposited in a specified order. The game encompasses distinct variants, including eight-ball, nine-ball, and several others.

Bar billiards

The game, in its current form, started in the UK in the 1930s. The tables were made by the Jelkes company of Holloway Road in London, and sold to many pubs.

Today, it mostly played in southern England and Jersey on a special table without side and corner pockets, but with 9 scoring holes in the playing surface. On the playfield are normally placed three skittles--guarding the highest scoring holes (the two 50 point holes and the 200 point hole). The aim of the game is to score as many points as possible by potting balls down the holes before either the time runs out or a skittle is knocked over. The last ball can only be potted by getting it into the 100 or 200 point hole after bouncing off one cushion.

Slot Machines

Ticket machines (USA)
In most states of the U.S., slots are available in bars, these are called "Ticket machines", in which you can put any cash between $5 to $500 in the machines, to gain money to afford more drinks and food at the bars, if winning. These machines varies by themes such as poker-theme to treasure-theme slots, and as well dealing with lottery numbers. They're legal in several states except for those in which owning slots are illegal, such as: Utah and Hawaii. And as well states that don't allow slot machines in any commercial building, these includes: Alabama, Arizona, California, Connecticut, Georgia, Idaho, Kansas, Kentucky, Nebraska, Minnesota, New Hampshire, New Mexico, South Carolina, South Dakota, Oklahoma, Oregon, South Carolina, Tennessee, Texas, Vermont, Virginia, Wisconsin and Wyoming. And although in the eastern parts of Iowa, these machines are found at most bars, the rest of the state, they are less available.

Bat and ball games

Coin pushing/throwing games

Pitch penny

A game which involves throwing coins across the room and into a hole carved in the seat of a wooden bench.

Shove ha'penny (or "shove halfpenny")

Played by two players on a small, smooth board, made of slate or wood. A number of parallel lines or grooves run horizontally across this board. Ha'pennies or similarly-sized coins or metal discs are placed at one end of the board and are shoved with a quick flick of the hand. The object is to shove the coins so that a certain number of them (normally five) lie between the lines. The two players take alternate turns. In addition to shoving his own coin directly between the lines, a player may use his turn to knock his own coins into position. One set of coins is used by both players.

Toad in the hole

Involves the throwing of brass discs, called Toads, at a hole in a lead-topped table. A variation of this game has been played in pubs in East Sussex, UK, the 'hole' being in the centre of the lead surface.

Drinking games

Other games
Bagatelle
Bowls
Skittles
Table shuffleboard
Table football

See also

 Pub quiz 
 Karaoke

References

External links
 Online guide to traditional games
 Toad in the hole in the Online guide to traditional games
 Shove ha'penny Article
 Hickok Sports History